Bullet in a Bible is a live album by American rock band Green Day, released on November 15, 2005, by Reprise Records. It was directed by Samuel Bayer, who was the director of all the videos from American Idiot.

Background and release
Bullet in a Bible documents one of the two biggest shows that Green Day have performed in their career; they played in front of a crowd of over 130,000 people at the Milton Keynes National Bowl in United Kingdom on June 18–19, 2005.

This was also the hottest weekend of the year, because the United Kingdom was currently in the middle of a heatwave, with temperatures reaching 33 degrees Celsius.

The band was supported by Jimmy Eat World, Taking Back Sunday, and Hard-Fi during their American Idiot world tour. Fourteen of the twenty songs performed at these shows were included on the disc; missing out were the tracks "Jaded", "Knowledge", "She", "Maria", "Homecoming" and "We Are the Champions". However, "She" was broadcast on BBC Radio 1 as part of their coverage of the event.

Bullet in a Bible was released as a double-LP set on November 10, 2009, as part of the band's 2009 vinyl re-release campaign.

Green Day have released most of the videos from this concert on their YouTube page except for "Boulevard of Broken Dreams", "Wake Me Up When September Ends", and the other songs which have been omitted from the album release.

Commercial performance
Bullet in a Bible peaked on the Billboard 200 at number eight and spent 14 weeks on the chart. It has also reached top 10 positions in many European countries.

Track listing

Personnel

Green Day
 Billie Joe Armstrong – lead vocals, lead guitar, rhythm guitar, harmonica
 Mike Dirnt  – bass, backing vocals
 Tré Cool – drums, percussion, backing vocals

Additional musicians
 Jason White – lead guitar, rhythm guitar, backing vocals
 Jason Freese – keyboards, piano, acoustic guitar, trombone, saxophone, accordion, backing vocals
 Ronnie Blake – trumpet, timpani, percussion, backing vocals
 Mike Pelino – rhythm guitar, backing vocals on St. Jimmy

Production

CD
 Rob Cavallo – producer
 Green Day – producers
 Doug McKean – engineer
 Chris Lord-Alge – mixing
 Dmitar Krnjaic – assistant engineer
 Keith Armstrong – assistant engineer
 John Van Nest – editing
 Ted Jensen – mastering

DVD
 Samuel Bayer – director
 Tim Lynch – producer
 Pat Magnarella – executive producer
 Kim Dellara – executive producer
 Tim Royes – editor
 Chris Dugan – additional filming

Design
 Wade Brands – photography
 Chris Bilheimer – packaging, menu design

Charts

Weekly charts

Year-end charts

Certifications and sales

References

External links

Bullet in a Bible at YouTube (streamed copy where licensed)
 The Killers "offended" by Green Day

2005 live albums
Concert films
American Idiot
Green Day albums
Reprise Records live albums